The 2020 Norwegian Athletics Championships was the year's national outdoor track and field championships for Norway. It was held from 2–4 August at the Fana Stadion in Bergen.  It was organised by Fana IL, IL Gneist and IL Bjarg serving as organisers.

The King's Cups were won by Jakob Ingebrigtsen and Amalie Iuel.

Championships
Several outdoor senior national championships were staged. Separate championships are also arranged for juniors and masters athletes, and in several cases there are separate junior and masters events incorporated into the senior championships.

Results

Men

Women

Referanser

Results
 NM Bergen 2020

External links
Official website

Norwegian Athletics Championships
Norwegian Athletics Championships
Norwegian Athletics Championships
Norwegian Athletics Championships
Sports competitions in Bergen